The 2023 season will be the Las Vegas Raiders' upcoming 54th season in the National Football League, their 64th overall, their fourth in Las Vegas and their second under the head coach/general manager tandem of Josh McDaniels and Dave Ziegler. 

This will be the first season since 2013 without long-time quarterback Derek Carr on the opening day roster, as he was released on February 14. They will attempt to improve on their 6–11 record from last year, make the playoffs after a one-year absence, and end their 20-year AFC West title drought.

Offseason

Notable players released

Draft

Notes
 On March 10, 2023, complete list of Raiders' draft picks was released.

Staff

Current roster

Preseason
The Raiders' preseason opponents and schedule will be announced in the spring.

Regular season

2023 opponents
Listed below are the Raiders' opponents for 2023. Exact dates and times will be announced in the spring.

References

External links 
 

Las Vegas
Las Vegas Raiders seasons
Las Vegas Raiders